Mikhail Saltykov (born 1925) was a Belarusian steeplechase runner. He competed in the men's 3000 metres steeplechase at the 1952 Summer Olympics, representing the Soviet Union.

References

External links
  

1925 births
Possibly living people
Athletes (track and field) at the 1952 Summer Olympics
Belarusian male steeplechase runners
Soviet male steeplechase runners
Belarusian male middle-distance runners
Olympic athletes of the Soviet Union
Place of birth missing